In December 2022, a series of floods began to severely affect the provinces of Misamis Occidental and Misamis Oriental, and some parts of the Visayan islands in the Philippines. The floods were caused by intense rain, which poured down on the central and southern parts of the country.

Cause 
The Philippine Atmospheric Geophysical and Astronomical Services Administration (PAGASA) said in a statement that the widespread rains were triggered by the shear line collision located within the regions of Visayas and Mindanao. The shear line then persisted towards the Eastern Visayas and CARAGA regions in the central and northern parts of the country. Low pressure areas and northeast monsoon also contributed. As of January 22, 2023, the shear line still persists.

Impact 

The provincial government of Misamis Occidental declared a state of calamity (SOC) as they received the full brunt of the flooding. The cities of Gingoog, Ozamiz, and provincial capital of Oroquieta, as well as surrounding municipalities were most affected by the floods. Samar, Northern Samar and Eastern Samar also declared SOC.

Notes

External links
National Disaster Risk Reduction and Management Council
Effects of Shear Line (2022)
Effects of Low Pressure Areas, Northeast Monsoon, and Shear Line (2023)

References 

2022 disasters in the Philippines
2022 floods in Asia
2023 disasters in the Philippines
2023 floods in Asia
December 2022 events in the Philippines
Floods in the Philippines
History of Misamis Occidental
History of Misamis Oriental